James N. Boyce (born June 22, 1951) is a Canadian tennis administrator and former Canadian No. 1 tennis player.

A native of Toronto, Ontario, Boyce was active on tour in the 1970s and captained Mississippi State University in varsity tennis. 

Boyce won the Western Ontario Open in 1970 against a field of U.S. players. In 1971, Boyce was runner-up at the Canadian National Championships (closed) to Peter Burwash. He won the Sarasota Open in 1973. 

Boyce won the Canadian National Men's singles and doubles championship (closed) in 1976, gaining the Canadian No. 1 ranking as a result. 

He featured in the 1977 Davis Cup (held in late 1976), playing ties against the Caribbean and Mexico with a record of 2-0 in singles.

Since 1998 he has served as Executive Director of the Ontario Tennis Association.

See also
List of Canada Davis Cup team representatives

References

External links
 
 
 

1951 births
Living people
Canadian male tennis players
Tennis players from Toronto
Mississippi State Bulldogs tennis players
Canadian sports executives and administrators
Tennis executives